The International School of Samui (ISS;) is an international school on the island of Koh Samui in Thailand. 

Its curriculum is structured in accordance with the National Curriculum of England. The majority of the teaching staff are British and are recruited from the UK. The sole language of instruction is English. The school has 270 students, both boys and girls from 3 to 18 years of age, currently enrolled from 35 different countries. It is organised into 4 phases: Early Years, Primary School, Senior School and Sixth Form.

History of International School of Samui 
ISS was founded in 2007 under its old name of Bluewater by former Headmaster, Mr. Jeremy Lees, a UK Qualified Teacher, ISI International School Inspector and former British Army Officer and Helicopter Pilot. Mr Lees remains chairman of the board of governors. Mr Stephen Andrews was appointed as CEO, replacing the role of Headmaster, in December 2021. As of 2021 there are approximately 270 students currently enrolled.

Accreditation 
ISS is accredited by Education Development Trust & ISQM, formally known as CfBT Education Trust. ISS is an accredited Cambridge International Examinations Centre, Pearson EdExcel Examinations Centre, and member of ISAT (International Schools Association of Thailand).

Houses 
There are 3 houses in the Primary School named after mythical creatures:
 Phoenix (Red)
 Griffin (Blue)
 Pegasus (Green)

There are 2 houses in Senior School:
 Oxford (Oxford Blue)
 Cambridge (Cambridge Blue)

Each house is led by a House Captain and all students are enrolled in the Houses. Competitions and activities are held throughout the year to win House trophies given at the end of the academic year on Speech Day. 

International schools in Thailand
Buildings and structures in Surat Thani province
Educational institutions established in 2006
Private schools in Thailand
2006 establishments in Thailand